Gene Morgan (1926 – 15 June 2010) was a Gaelic footballer who played as a right corner-back for the Crossmaglen Rangers club, at senior level for the Armagh county team and at inter-provincial level for Ulster.

References

1926 births
2010 deaths
Armagh inter-county Gaelic footballers
Crossmaglen Rangers Gaelic footballers
Ulster inter-provincial Gaelic footballers